Seraina Boner (born 11 April 1982) is a Swiss cross-country skier who has been competing since 1998. She has competed at the 2006 Winter Olympics in Torino and the 2014 Winter Olympics in Sochi.

Cross-country skiing results
All results are sourced from the International Ski Federation (FIS).

Olympic Games

World Championships

World Cup

Season standings

References

External links

1982 births
Cross-country skiers at the 2006 Winter Olympics
Cross-country skiers at the 2014 Winter Olympics
Living people
Olympic cross-country skiers of Switzerland
Swiss female cross-country skiers
People from Davos
Sportspeople from Graubünden
21st-century Swiss women